Orthocomotis yanayacu is a species of moth of the family Tortricidae. It is found in Napo Province, Ecuador.

The wingspan is about 25.5 mm. The ground colour of the forewings is white, limited to the edges of the markings and blotches in the terminal part of the wing. The remaining area is grey or scaled with orange and green. The hindwings are brownish.

Etymology
The species name refers to the name of the reservation where the species was first collected, Yanayacu.

References

Moths described in 2007
Orthocomotis
Moths of South America
Taxa named by Józef Razowski